An Anthology of Australian Verse (1907) is an anthology of poems edited by Australian critic Bertram Stevens. The editor notes in his introduction that the book is "A selection of published and previously unpublished verse" representative of the best short poems written by Australians or inspired by Australian scenery and conditions of life, - 'Australian' in this connection being used to include New Zealand.'

Critical reception

A reviewer in The Leader noted that the anthology "will be gratefully received by those who are willing to acknowledge that there are sweet strains worth remembrance among the vast volume of minor poetry. If a critical judgment may cavil at the inclusion of some who have been awarded this distinction, the plea may be urged that we know not the mass of rejection." And concluded "On the whole, the work of selection has been well done, and the editor may be complimented on the discretion and critical taste he has displayed. "

In The Western Mail a reviewer was unequivocal: "This is perhaps the most serious effort that has yet been made to compile an anthology of Australian poetry, and not until many years shall have passed, and a greater store of poetic material shall have been acquired, will the publication be superseded. It is beyond doubt the best of its kind that has yet appeared, and for this result the able editor deserves more than a passing word of thanks. The best writers are, so far as
it is possible to average the general taste, represented by their best work, and most poems that have earned a justified popular favour, have, where length has permitted, been included."

Contents

See also

 The full text of the anthology is available from Project Gutenberg Australia
 1907 in Australian literature
 1907 in poetry

References

1907 anthologies
Australian poetry anthologies
1907 poetry books
Angus & Robertson books